An American Dream is the eleventh album from The Nitty Gritty Dirt Band. The Nitty Gritty Dirt Band (a.k.a. The Dirt Band) is notable for having many charting albums and singles. "An American Dream" is a song written by Rodney Crowell. He recorded it under the title "Voilá, An American Dream" on his 1978 album Ain't Living Long Like This, and released it as the B-side to that album's single "(Now and Then There's) A Fool Such as I".

Track listing
"An American Dream" (Crowell) – 3:53
"In Her Eyes" (Roberts) – 4:16
"Take Me Back" (Hanna, Fadden, Hathaway) – 3:03
"Jas'moon" (Hanna, Hathaway, Bregante, Garth, Carpenter) – 3:27
"Dance the Night Away" (Carpenter, Holster) – 4:21
"New Orleans" (Guido Royster) – 3:59
"Happy Feet" (Bregante, Garth) – 3:59
"Do You Feel the Way I Do" (Hanna, Fadden) – 3:58
"What's On Your Mind" (Hanna, Hathaway, Bregante) – 3:44
"Wolverton Mountain'" (Kilgore, King) – 3:16

Charts

Personnel
Jeff Hanna
Jimmie Fadden
Al Garth
Richard Hathaway
John McEuen
Drums - Merel Bregente, David Peters
Bass - Richard Hathaway, Leon Medica
Guitars - Jeff Hanna, Jimmie Fadden, John McEuen, Jeff Pollard, Tony Haselden, Bobby Mason
Banjo / Mandolin / Dobro / Lap Steel – John McEuen
Harp – Jimmie Fadden
Violin – Al Garth
Keyboards – Al Garth, Bob Carpenter, Rod Roddy, Al Kooper
Percussion – Bobby Lakind, Merel Bregante, Bobby Campo
Harmony Vocals – Linda Ronstadt
Horn Section
Saxophone – Al Garth
Trumpet, Cornet – Bobby Campo
Bari – Funky Lester
Horn Arrangements & Solos – Al Garth

Production
Producer – Jeff Hanna and Bob Edwards

See also 
Nitty Gritty Dirt Band discography

References
Track listing, personnel, and production information from album liner notes unless otherwise noted.

Nitty Gritty Dirt Band albums
1979 albums
United Artists Records albums